Vebjørn is a given name. Notable people with the given name include:

Vebjørn Berg (born 1980), Norwegian sports shooter
Vebjørn Hoff (born 1996), Norwegian footballer
Vebjørn Rodal (born 1972), Norwegian middle distance athlete
Vebjørn Sand (born 1966), Norwegian painter and artist
Vebjørn Selbekk (born 1969), Norwegian newspaper editor and author
Vebjørn Tandberg (1904–1978), Norwegian electronics engineer
Vebjørn Vinje (born 1995), Norwegian footballer